Bonna Mirza (born 9 september) is a Bangladeshi actress both in television and film, and on stage, and a social activist too. She has acted more than thousand Television-dramas and some remarkable films. Mirza started her career in 1992 with theatre group ‘DeshNatok’, a member of group theater federation. She is an enlisted artist of Bangladesh Television (BTV) and Bangladesh Betar. Her notable theatre performances are ‘NityaPuran’ and ‘Darpane Sharatshashi’, ‘A Dolls’  House’, ‘Ghorlopat’ among some more. In television acting, she has done more than a thousand. She is an elected secretary of Actors' Equity, the professional organization of the television actors,  from 2018. She is a speaker on various social issues in different social forums – educational institutions, social organizations, TV channels.

Early life and education
Born in Kushtia, Mirza was with her parents. Her father is a retired government officer and mother is a housewife. She is second among three sisters and she has a brother. She took secondary examination from Kushtia Govt. Girls' High School. Later she moved to Dhaka for study, and completed her master's degree in theater and performance studies from University of Dhaka.

Career
Mirza debuted her acting career in 1992 with the theatre troupe Desh Natok. Some years later, she started acting in television drama in 1997, while she still was in the university. After years of professional acting on television, she started anchoring television program with renowned Bangladeshi television channels like Ekattor TV, News 24, G-TV etc. Since 2015, she also started career as a marketing professional and currently working as Head of Marketing in Bangla Tribune. Her first performance in television drama was in Shukher Nongor, directed by Saidul Anam Tutul, in 1997. Mirza is the anchor of the television show Ekattorer Shokal of Ekattor TV. She performed in Tanvir Mokammel's directorial venture Rabeya (2009).

Mirza was elected the programme secretary for the Film Artistes' Association.

Works

Television dramas

Stage plays
 Shurgaon
 Nityapuran
 Birsa Kabbo
 Ghor Lopat

Movie
 Head Master
 Omar Faruker Maa
 Pita
 Rabeya
 Shorot 71

Awards

Personal life
Mirza got married in 2010 to Manosh Chowdhury. Her husband teaches at Jahangirnagar University.

References

Living people
Bangladeshi film actresses
Bangladeshi television actresses
Bangladeshi stage actresses
Bangladeshi television personalities
University of Dhaka alumni
Place of birth missing (living people)
Year of birth missing (living people)